Auvilliers is a commune in the Seine-Maritime department in the Normandy region in northern France.

Geography
It was here that petit-suisse cheese was first produced.

Population

Places of interest
 The eighteenth century church of St.Jean-Baptiste.
 A chateau dating from the nineteenth century.

See also
Communes of the Seine-Maritime department

References

Communes of Seine-Maritime